The Haikou Great Hall of the People is a performance venue located adjacent to the west side of Evergreen Park, Haikou City, Hainan Province, China.

References

External links
 
 Image of interior

Buildings and structures in Haikou
Performing arts venues in China
Tourist attractions in Hainan
2010 establishments in China